Ali Akbar Mikrani,, is a Former Chief Justice of Appellate Court of Nepal. Currently he is a member of the Supreme Court Bar Association of Nepal. He was also served as a chairman of the Central Hajj Committee of Nepal in 2013.

Early life
He was born at Kattarban village of Rajdevi VDC of Rautahat district in the year of 1956 in one of the well established Muslim family of Nepal. he did his schooling in his village and later studied in India.  His grandfather Maula Bakhsh Mikrani was once jailed for 6 months at nakhu Kathmandu at the time of Rana Prime Minister Chandra Shumsher Jang Bahadur Rana.
His grandfather was also a well known social activist in the area of Sarlahi and Rautahat district. His grandfather Maula Bakhsh Mikrani was honored by "Chaudhry" title by that times Rana government of Nepal as His ancestor died by fighting with British force at Samanpur of Rautahat District is now Murtiya village in Sarlahi district. still, a large number of drinking water well and public places can be seen in Sarlahi and Rautahat district made by Maula Bakhsh Chaudhry during his service.

International Participation
He was representative of Nepal in December 2011 at a WCPA strategy meeting and participation in the International Conference of Chief Justices of the World. Which took place at the World Unity Convention Center of the City Montessori School of Lucknow. This was the first year that the call for a world parliament was unanimous among the more than 100 justices present at the Chief Justices Conference. he was a Honorary Sponsor of the Earth Constitution and member Collegium of World Judges.

National Participation
The fifth and last regional level consultative workshop on the draft of Strategic Plan ( 2011–13) of the National Human Rights Commission of Nepal was held in Janakpur on April 21, 2011. The programme was presided over by the Officiating Regional Director Buddha Narayan Sahani Kewat and the programme was chaired by Honorable Ali Akbar Mikrani, Chief Judge of Appellate Court as the Guest of Honour.

On 31 October 2009 a seminar on Initiative for State-building and Constitutional Dynamics held by Friedrich-Ebert-Stiftung (FES), Nepal, in Rajbiraj. he was Chief guest of the seminar and underlined the need of consensus among political parties in his speech. At that time he was the Chief Justice of Appellate Court of Rajbiraj. He expressed doubt over the drafting of constitution because of power struggle of leaders. He said that on federalism even German and Indian scholars could not satisfy him. Leadership's greed for power has weakened the state. It is remittance that is helping the Nepalese economy. Due to open border with India people are sustaining their lives. The success of the constitution of one state cannot be an example for another.

In 2013, he successfully manage the Hajj for the Nepali Muslims pilgrims for Saudi Arabia as a chairman of the Central Hajj Committee of Nepal (CHC), the government body that manages the Hajj for the Nepali Muslims.

References

21st-century Nepalese judges
Mikrani People of Nepal
People from Rautahat District
Madhesi people